Vivo...Para Contarlo (English: Live... to Tell) is the first live album by Spanish rock band Fito & Fitipaldis. It was published by DRO in 2004. The concert was performed 19 August 2004 in Bilbao.

Track listing (CD)

Track listing (DVD)

Chart performance

Certifications

References 

2003 albums
Fito & Fitipaldis albums
Spanish-language live albums
Spanish-language video albums